Takifugu stictonotus is a species of pufferfish in the family Tetraodontidae. It is native to the Northwest Pacific, where it ranges from Hokkaido to the East China Sea and the Yellow Sea. It is a demersal species that reaches 35 cm (13.8 inches) SL. In Mandarin Chinese, the species is known as 密点多纪鲀, translating to "dense pufferfish".

References 

stictonotus